The 1967 Australian referendum occurred on 27 May 1967 under the Holt Government. It contained three topics asked about in two questions, regarding the passage of two bills to alter the Australian Constitution.

The first question (Constitution Alteration (Parliament) Bill 1967) sought to increase the number of Members in the House of Representatives. The second question (Constitution Alteration (Aboriginals) Bill 1967) related to Indigenous Australians (referred to as "the Aboriginal Race") and was in two parts: whether to give the Federal Government the power to make laws for Indigenous Australians in states, and whether in population counts for constitutional purposes to include all Indigenous Australians.

Results in detail

Parliament
This section is an excerpt from 1967 Australian referendum (Parliament) § Results

Aboriginal people
This section is an excerpt from 1967 Australian referendum (Aboriginals) § Results

See also
Referendums in Australia
Politics of Australia
History of Australia

References

Further reading
  
 .
 Australian Electoral Commission (2007) Referendum Dates and Results 1906 – Present AEC, Canberra.

1967 referendums
1967
May 1967 events in Australia